Ngāruawāhia railway station was at the junction of the North Island Main Trunk line and its Glen Massey branch, serving Ngāruawāhia in the Waikato District of New Zealand,  south of Auckland and  north of Hamilton. It was opened with a special train from Auckland on Monday 13 August 1877. The next stations were Taupiri  to the north and Horotiu  to the south.

In 2020 reopening of the remaining platform was put forward as a COVID-19 recovery scheme, estimated to cost $15m.

History 
The station opened on 13 August 1877, as Newcastle, when the line was extended  from the previous terminus at Mercer, though the stationmaster's house was added later. It ceased to be the terminus when the line was extended to Te Awamutu on 1 July 1880. The name was changed in 1878. Two months after opening, a platform was built opposite the Delta Hotel in the town centre, though the goods shed remained to the south.

The 1902 edition of The Cyclopedia of New Zealand described the station as wooden, with an asphalt platform, goods shed, lamp and luggage rooms, a ladies' room, public waiting room, stationmaster's office and a post office. A new station was reported as open in 1915, though in 1916 the station was reported as "rearranged considerably", which seems to have been when it was moved to about half way between the hotel and the goods shed. Electric lights were installed in 1921.

Traffic grew steadily (see graph and table below). The greatest increase was at the start of World War 2, presumably consisting largely of soldiers and relatives travelling to and from Hopuhopu camp.

Waikato River Bridges

1877 road-rail bridge 
Work started on a road rail bridge over the Waikato River, with three  spans late in 1874, with pile driving started on 18 January 1875. Cylinders for the piers were delivered in 1875 and the first was put in place on 24 June 1875. The bridge was said to be near completion in April 1876, and a test train was run over it and it opened for road traffic in December 1876. However, it wasn't reported as finished until 1877, the year of a permanent way contract for the 30 miles from Mercer for £16,832. The bridge, like the station, opened for rail traffic on 13 August 1877.

Gates, controlled from the bridgekeeper's house, kept road traffic off the bridge when trains were due. Although it was planned to demolish the house in 1929, it survived until the bridge was demolished in 1968.

1931 rail bridge 

In 1928 it was decided to replace the 1877 bridge, as it needed repair. It was designed by NZR, using over 253 tons of steel (or 255 tons). It was made in Britain, fabricated by A & G Price and cost £25,000. The last rivet was driven in February, the first train crossed the bridge on 13 March and by November 1931 the old bridge was being used for northbound road traffic. At that time it was expected that the old bridge would be refurbished for rail use when the track was doubled, so it was leased to the Main Highways Board.

1974 crash 
21 wagons of a southbound train derailed and piled up on the northernmost truss of the bridge after an axle broke on 14 July 1974.

2002 repair 
On 14 March 1998 part of train 235 hit the 1931 bridge, requiring the replacement of 2 of the trusses with 2 x  beams in 2001/2 by McConnell Smith.

Gallery

References

External links 
 1944 one inch map of location

Timetables
 1877, 1879, 1880, Feb 1882, Mar 1882, Sep 1882, Jan 1883, Mar 1883

Photos

Sir George Grey Special Collections, Auckland Libraries photos –
 1901 regatta crowds at station
Hamilton Libraries - 1910 view of station and Delta Hotel
 National Library – Railway Bridge c1910, 1900s train at station opposite Delta Hotel, c1905 station and Delta Hotel, steam train at station c 1927, aerial photos -1959, 1972 
 1930s views of the railway bridge construction 8 Feb, 23 Apr, 9 August 1930 and 14 Feb1931. 
 Google Street View of station site

Ngāruawāhia
Rail transport in Waikato
Railway stations opened in 1877
Railway stations closed in 1988
Defunct railway stations in New Zealand
Railway bridges in New Zealand
Buildings and structures in Waikato
1877 establishments in New Zealand